Alfred Erskine Marling (October 5, 1858 – May 29, 1935) was a Canadian-born American businessman. He served as the president of Horace S. Ely & Co. and later president of the Chamber of Commerce of the State of New York.

Early life
Alfred Erskine Marling was born on October 5, 1858 in Toronto, Ontario, Canada to Reverend Francis Henry Marling and Marina Catherine MacDonald. Both parents were born in England. He had a brother, Charles Edward Marling (c1860-1937). He migrated to the United States on December 1, 1875. He married Harriet Winslow Philips (1846-1934) on January 10, 1884 in Manhattan, New York City. They had a child, Harold Erskin Marling (1886-1898).

Career
Marling served as the president of Horace S. Ely & Co. and later president of the Chamber of Commerce of the State of New York.

Marling headed the Union League Club of New York, and was a director or trustee in 16 corporations, he made national news in 1919 by proposing a $5,000,000 (approximately $ today) housing corporation to move 20,000 New Yorkers from tenements into modern low-cost apartments.

Death
Marling died on May 29, 1935 in Manhattan, New York City. He was buried in Woodlawn Cemetery in Bronx, New York City.

References

1859 births
1935 deaths
People from Old Toronto
Canadian emigrants to the United States
Businesspeople from New York City
Chamber of Commerce of the State of New York
Burials at Woodlawn Cemetery (Bronx, New York)